Yakir Ben Moshe (Born 1973) is an Israeli poet and, since 2000, editor of Beit Bialik, Tel Aviv. His first book, Every Morning at Least One Blond Guy Becomes Bald, was published in 2003 and won the Culture Minister's prize the same year.

References

Israeli poets
1973 births
Living people
Tel Aviv University alumni
Recipients of Prime Minister's Prize for Hebrew Literary Works